Habit is a 2021 American comedy thriller film directed by Janell Shirtcliff in her feature directorial debut, from a screenplay by Shirtcliff and Libby Mintz. It stars Bella Thorne, Gavin Rossdale, Libby Mintz, Andreja Pejić, Ione Skye, Jamie Hince, Alison Mosshart, Paris Jackson and Josie Ho.

The film was released in the United States on August 20, 2021, by Lionsgate.

Premise

A Los Angeles girl goes on the run with her friends. The group hide out while dressed as nuns when they run afoul of a drug lord.

Cast

Production
Bella Thorne, Gavin Rossdale, Jamie Hince, Soko, and Alison Mosshart joined the cast of the film in early 2020, with Janell Shirtcliff directing from a screenplay by Suki Kaiser from a story by Shirtcliff and Libby Mintz, with Thorne serving as an executive producer. By April 2020, Josie Ho, Paris Jackson, Andreja Pejic, Bria Vinaite and Libby Mintz had joined the cast of the film.

Principal photography began in February 2020.

Release
The film was released on August 20, 2021, by Lionsgate.

Reception

Critical response

Controversy
The film attracted controversy by the Christian right for the supposedly blasphemous and sacrilegious themes of depicting Jesus as lesbian before its release. As of June 30, 2020, more than 260,000 people had signed a petition in order to block the film. Detractors labelled the film as "Christianophobic garbage" as well as claiming that it aims to "ridicule people of faith". The New York Post compared the controversy to that of the 2019 Brazilian satirical film The First Temptation of Christ, which depicted Jesus as gay and resulted in a ban overturned by the Supreme Federal Court. However, there is no indication of promotional materials that portray Jesus as a lesbian.

References

External links
 

2021 films
2021 action comedy films
2021 black comedy films
2021 directorial debut films
2021 LGBT-related films
2020s American films
2020s comedy thriller films
2020s English-language films
American action comedy films
American black comedy films
American comedy thriller films
American LGBT-related films
Christianity in popular culture controversies
Films about Catholic nuns
Films about LGBT and Christianity
Films produced by Donovan Leitch (actor)
Films produced by Josie Ho
Films set in Los Angeles
LGBT-related black comedy films
LGBT-related comedy thriller films
LGBT-related controversies in film
Lionsgate films
Obscenity controversies in film
Religious controversies in film
Voltage Pictures films